Jimmy McGill (10 March 1926 – 21 April 2013) was a Scottish former footballer who played as a forward.

McGill was best known for his time with Queen of the South where he was part of the Palmerston Park club's front-line, alongside Bobby Black, Jim Patterson, Jackie Oakes and Walter Rothera. McGill also played for Derby County, Kilmarnock, Berwick Rangers and Cowdenbeath.

McGill died at a care home in Cumbernauld at the age of 87 after suffering from dementia.

References

1926 births
2013 deaths
Queen of the South F.C. players
Derby County F.C. players
Bury F.C. players
Kilmarnock F.C. players
Cowdenbeath F.C. players
Maryhill Harp F.C. players
Scottish Junior Football Association players
Scottish Football League players
People from Kilsyth
English Football League players
Association football forwards
Scottish footballers
Berwick Rangers F.C. players
Footballers from North Lanarkshire